The Chatham Square station was an express station on the demolished IRT Third Avenue Line in Manhattan, New York City. It had two levels. The lower level had two tracks and one island platform that served trains of both the IRT Second Avenue Line and IRT Third Avenue Line. The upper level had three tracks and two island platforms that served trains of both lines going to and from City Hall. Second Avenue trains served the station until June 13, 1942, and City Hall Spur trains served the station until December 31, 1953. This station closed entirely on May 12, 1955, with the ending of all service on the Third Avenue El south of 149th Street.

References

External links

IRT Third Avenue Line stations
IRT Second Avenue Line stations
Railway stations in the United States opened in 1878
Railway stations closed in 1955
1878 establishments in New York (state)
1955 disestablishments in New York (state)
Former elevated and subway stations in Manhattan